Panlongia was a small-sized (up to 2 cm) marine arthropod, with an oval-shaped non-calcified exoskeleton. Both the head shield (or cephalon) and the tail shield (or pygidium) are  semi-circular.  In between the cephalon and pygidium are four thoracic body segments (somites). The cephalon occupies approximately ⅓ of the body length, the thorax ¼ and pygidium about 45%. Panlongia lived during the late Lower Cambrian (Botomian) in what is today South China. In Panlongia spinosa the edge of the exoskeleton carries several small sawtooth-like spines, that are absent in P. tetranodusa.

Distribution 
 Panlongia spinosa is found in the late Lower Cambrian (Botomian) of China (Wulongqing Formation, only at Gaoloufang Kgs-2).
 Panlongia tetranodusa occurs in the late Lower Cambrian (Botomian) of China (Wulongqing Formation, Gaoloufang Kgs-1, and Shijiangjun Wsh-14, Wuding County, Yunnan, "Guanshan fauna").

Taxonomy 
The phylogenetic position of Panlongia remains uncertain, because the appendages remain unknown sofar. Panlongia cannot yet with confidence be assigned to the Helmetiida or the Nektaspida, as was initially suggested.

Ecology 
Panlongia tetranodusa occurs with the coeloscleritophoran Allonia sp., the vetulicolian Vetulicola gangtoucunensis, lingulate brachiopods Lingulellotreta malongensis, Diandongia pista, Acrothele rara, and Westonia gubaiensis; dinocaridid Anomalocaris saron, hyolith Linevitus malongensis, eocrinoid Wudingeocrinus rarus, Trilobites Redlichia yunnanensis, R. mansuyi, R. noetlingi, R. conica, R. shijiangjunensis, Palaeolenus douvillei, and P. lantenoisi; crustaceans: Tuzoia sinensis, T. tylodesa, Branchiocaris sp., Liangshanella liangshanensis, and Neokunmingella sp., and several other arthropods like Longquania bispinosa,  Guangweicaris spinatus; Leanchoilia illecebrosa, Isoxys minor, I. wudingensis and Gangtoucunia aspera.

See also
Cambrian explosion
Phytophilaspis

References 

Maotianshan shales fossils
Cambrian arthropods